Clinantheae is a tribe (in the family Amaryllidaceae, subfamily Amaryllidoideae), where it forms part of the Andean clade, one of two American clades. The tribe was described in 2000 by Alan Meerow et al. as a result of a molecular phylogenetic study of the American Amaryllidoideae. This demonstrated that the tribe Stenomesseae, including the type genus Stenomesson was polyphyletic. Part of the tribe segregated with the Eucharideae and were submerged into it, while the other part formed a unique subclade. Since the type species of Stenomesson was not part of the second subclade, it was necessary to form a new name for the remaining species together with the other genera that remained. This was Clinanthus, the oldest name for these species, and consequently the tribe Clinantheae.

Taxonomy

Phylogeny 
The placement of Clinantheae within subfamily Amaryllidoideae is shown in the following cladogram, where this tribe is shown as a sister group to the Hymenocallideae.

Subdivision 
Four [three] genera (species):
 Clinanthus (20) Type
 Pamianthe (2)
 Paramongaia (1)
 [Pucara (1)]

Pucara as Pucara leucantha was later shown to be indistinguishable from Stenomesson, and was transferred as Stenomesson leucanthum

References

Bibliography

 , in 
 
(additional excerpts)

External links

Amaryllidoideae
Asparagales tribes